George T. Reid (30 January 1882 – 8 September 1960) was a Scottish professional football inside left and centre forward who played in the Football League for Middlesbrough and Bradford Park Avenue. He is best remembered for his time in the Southern League with Brentford, for whom he scored 58 goals in 102 league appearances. He represented the Southern League XI and scored in victories over the Scottish League XI and the Football League XI in 1910.

Personal life 
Reid was married and had two sons.

Career statistics

References

Scottish footballers
Brentford F.C. players
English Football League players
Association football inside forwards
Southern Football League players
St Mirren F.C. players
Johnstone F.C. players
Footballers from Paisley, Renfrewshire
1882 births
Scottish Football League players
Clyde F.C. players
Clydebank F.C. (1965) players
Southern Football League representative players
Middlesbrough F.C. players
Bradford (Park Avenue) A.F.C. players
1960 deaths